is a stadium in Zürich, Switzerland, and the home of the athletics club LC Zürich, and the football clubs FC Zürich and Grasshopper Club Zürich. LC Zürich is a spin-off of FC Zürich whose members constructed the stadium in 1925. Grasshopper-Club has been using it as their home stadium since 2007. The annual track and field meet Weltklasse Zürich—part of the Diamond League—takes place at the Letzigrund since 1928, as well as frequent open-air concerts. On the Letzigrund track on 21 June 1960, Armin Hary was the first human being to run the 100 metres in 10,0 seconds.

Old stadium

The old stadium was opened on 22 November 1925 and was owned by FC Zürich. During the Great Depression, ownership changed to the city of Zurich in 1937 which has operated it since. It underwent extensive remodeling in 1947, 1958, 1973, and 1984. Lighting was added in 1973. The first open-air concert there was held in 1996.

The capacity was 25,000 and the main pitch was 105 by 68 meters with athletics facilities. There were also three other playing fields: 2 lawns, 1 artificial turf and a small packed sand field. The old Letzigrund also contained a bar and a restaurant within the stadium.

Matches

UEFA Euro 2008 
The stadium was one of the venues for the UEFA Euro 2008.

The following games were played at the stadium during the tournament

International matches

New stadium
In the Nineties, the athletics club Zürich was pushing for a modernisation of the facilities at Letzigrund in order to even better accommodate the athletes of Weltklasse Zürich. In 1997, the city parliament decided favourably on an upgrade of the stadium whereas simultaneously, the city administration was working on a reconstruction plan. At the same time, the owners of the Hardturm football stadium were also planning to reconstruct their stadium.

In 2003, the new Hardturm stadium was approved by the city population in a public vote, but subsequently, legal objections by neighbourhood and environmental groups put the timely realisation for the EURO 2008 tournament, for which it was chosen by UEFA in 2002 as one of eight venues, in jeopardy. As a result, the planning process for the new Letzigrund stadium was accelerated. In 2005, the city population approved in a vote the reconstruction of the public stadium, plus in a separate vote, the costs of temporarily adjusting the stadium to the requirements of EURO 2008.

Originally planned for 2009, the new Letzigrund stadium was opened on August 30, 2007. The first sports event there was the annual Weltklasse Zürich on September 7 with 26,500 spectators. The first football game was FC Zürich vs. Grasshopper Club Zürich on September 23. It hosted three games during the 2008 European championships, with a capacity of up to 30,000. The current capacity is 25,000 for football events, 26,000 for athletics and 50,000 for concerts.

Concerts

Gallery

See also
List of football stadiums in Switzerland

References

External links

Official Website 
Stadion Letzigrund 
Weltklasse Zürich stadium information

FC Zürich
Football venues in Switzerland
Athletics (track and field) venues in Switzerland
Diamond League venues
UEFA Euro 2008 stadiums in Switzerland
Sports venues in Zürich
Tourist attractions in Zürich
Sports venues completed in 2007
2007 establishments in Switzerland
21st-century architecture in Switzerland